Mudalal Khoury (born 18 June 1957) also known as Mudallal Khuri, a Syrian-Russian businessman and financier with close ties to the Syrian government of Bashar al-Assad.

Business activities 
Mudalal Khoury is linked to four companies, Balec Ventures, the sanctioned firm Argus Construction, and Tredwell Marketing and Armas Marketing.

Controversies 
In 2020, an investigation by Global Witness uncovered a money laundering operation run by Mudalal Khoury that assisted the Syrian government in avoiding sanctions and purchasing supplies.

Sanctions 
The US Treasury sanctioned Mudalal Khoury in 2015 for "an attempted procurement of ammonium nitrate in late 2013." Savaro Ltd., the trading firm which procured chemicals in 2013 that exploded in the 2020 Beirut port blast, shared a London address with companies linked to Syrian businessmen George Haswani, Mudalal and Imad Khoury.

References 

Syrian individuals subject to U.S. Department of the Treasury sanctions
1957 births
Living people
Russian people of Syrian descent
Syrian money launderers
Russian money launderers